Bine Stadium, is a multi-use stadium in Bine settlement of Baku, Azerbaijan. It is the home stadium of Bine FK.  The stadium holds 600 people and opened in 2012.

Events
The stadium was used as a training ground during 2012 FIFA U-17 Women's World Cup.

References

See also
List of football stadiums in Azerbaijan

Football venues in Azerbaijan
Sports venues in Baku